Robert Rehme (born 5 May 1935) is an American film producer whose credits include the films Patriot Games, Clear and Present Danger and The General's Daughter.

Career
In 1961, he was manager of RKO Theatres in Cincinnati and in 1969 he joined United Artists's advertising department. In 1976, he formed his own exhibition and distribution firm but later joined New World Pictures as vice president and general sales manager in February 1978.

He joined Avco Embassy Pictures in December 1978 and became president in 1981. When he started there he asked for $5 million to make movies. He used it to make eight. "The important thing was not to put Avco at risk for any major amount of money," he said. "We'd finance a movie and find a financial group to buy us out, so we could use the money over again." Under his stewardship the company went from earning $20 million in 1978 to $90 million in 1981.

In June 1981, he joined Universal Pictures, becoming president of the Theatrical Motion Picture Group in December 1982. He quit in December 1983.

In 1983, he became co-chairman and chief executive officer of New World Entertainment, Inc until 1989, when he and producer Mace Neufeld co-founded the motion picture production company Neufeld/Rehme Productions.  It was during this time that he created the pictures for which he is most known, such as Patriot Games and Flight of the Intruder.

Rehme served as a governor of the Academy of Motion Picture Arts and Sciences for eight years before becoming president in 1992, succeeding Karl Malden. Prior to that he had been President of the Academy Foundation. He could only serve as Academy President for one year as Academy rules stipulated that he could only sit on the board for nine consecutive terms. He rejoined the board and became president for a second time from 1997 to 2001.

Select Credits
He was a producer in all films unless otherwise noted.

Film

As Head of Avco

Thanks

Television

References

1935 births
Presidents of the Academy of Motion Picture Arts and Sciences
Businesspeople from Cincinnati
Living people
20th-century American businesspeople
American film producers
Film producers from Ohio
American film studio executives